Brendan Doggett (born 3 May 1994) is an Australian cricketer. A tall right-arm fast-medium bowler, he made his this List A debut for Cricket Australia XI on 1 October 2016. He made his first-class debut for Queensland in the 2017–18 Sheffield Shield season on 26 October 2017. On 31 October 2017, he signed his first Big Bash League contract for the Brisbane Heat. He made his Twenty20 debut for Brisbane Heat in the 2017–18 Big Bash League season on 20 December 2017.

Domestic career

2016–17 season

At the beginning of the season, Doggett earned a rookie contract with the Queensland Bulls, becoming just the second Indigenous Australian to have a contract with the team, but he did not play for them throughout the season, instead making his List A for Cricket Australia XI in the 2016–17 Matador BBQs One-Day Cup. He played in the first match against Queensland, and late in the innings he bowled fellow Queenslander Ben Cutting to take his first List A wicket. He took six wickets across four matches in the tournament, the second-most of any player for Cricket Australia XI.

2017–18 season

No longer in the Cricket Australia XI squad, Doggett played his first matches for Queensland in the 2017–18 JLT One-Day Cup and took five wickets for the team while conceding 6.19 runs per over in four matches. He then made his first-class debut in the opening round of the 2017–18 Sheffield Shield season. In his first innings of first-class bowling he had impressive figures of 4/33 while Victoria were bowled out for 148. In February 2018, in round eight of the 2017–18 Sheffield Shield season, he took his maiden five-wicket haul in first-class cricket.

2021–22 season
In 2021 Doggett moved to Adelaide and began playing for South Australia.

International career
In September 2018, he was named in Australia's Test squad for their series against Pakistan, but he did not play.

References

External links

1994 births
Living people
Australian cricketers
Indigenous Australian cricketers
Cricketers from Queensland
Brisbane Heat cricketers
Sydney Thunder cricketers
Cricket Australia XI cricketers
Queensland cricketers
South Australia cricketers